There have been a number of nuclear whistleblowers, often nuclear engineers, who have identified safety concerns about nuclear power and nuclear weapons production. That list is partial and non-exhaustive.

List

Other nuclear whistleblowers
 Chuck Atkinson
 Dale G. Bridenbaugh
 Joe Carson 
 Larry Criscione
 Mark Gillespie
 Lars-Olov Höglund
 Carl Hocevar
 David Hoffman
 Avon Hudson
 Shafiqul Islam
 Carl Patrickson
 Richard H. Perkins
 Robert Pollard
 John P. Shannon
 Don Ranft
 Zhores Medvedev
 Ronald A. Sorri
 Grigoris Lambrakis

See also
 Nuclear accidents in the United States
 Nuclear safety
 Anti-nuclear movement in the United States

References

External links
 
 Watching the Watchdogs
 A Nuclear Plant Gets New Equipment and a New Attitude
 Government Accountability Project Whistleblower protection Org.
 
 National Whistleblowers Center - Nuclear Whistleblowers

Nuclear, List
Nuclear whistleblowers
Nuclear safety and security
Nuclear whistleblowers